Argentala subalba is a moth of the family Notodontidae first described by Francis Walker in . It is found in Venezuela.

It is the smallest member of the genus Argentala, with a forewing length of 12–14 mm.

References

Moths described in 1859
Notodontidae of South America